Bagarchhap  is a village development committee in Manang District in the Gandaki Zone of northern Nepal. At the time of the 1991 Nepal census it had a population of 534 people living in 116 individual households.

On 10 November 1995 most of Bagarchap (around 80%) was destroyed by a landslide, which killed 11 villagers and 9 trekkers. Many villagers relocated to Danaque to the west and Bagarchhap is now much smaller than it was prior to the landslide.

References

Populated places in Manang District, Nepal
Landslides in Nepal
Landslides in 1995